Off-White (stylized as Off-White™ or OFF-WHITE c/o VIRGIL ABLOH) is an Italian luxury fashion label founded by American designer Virgil Abloh. The company was incorporated in Milan in 2012.

The label has collaborated with Nike, Levi's, Jimmy Choo, IKEA and Evian.

History
The company was first founded as "PYREX VISION" by Virgil Abloh in the Italian city of Milan in 2012.  Abloh then rebranded the company as Off-White in 2013, which he described as "the grey area between black and white as the color off-white" to the fashion world. It has shown collections at Paris Fashion Week shows, and is sold in retail stores in Hong Kong, Tokyo, Milan, London, United Kingdom and New York.

In August 2019, José Neves, owner of Farfetch, purchased New Guards Group, the parent organization of Off-White for US$675 million.

In July 2021, LVMH Moët Hennessy Louis Vuitton announced it would be taking a 60% stake in Off-White, with founder Virgil Abloh, at the time the creative director of menswear for Louis Vuitton, retaining the remaining 40%.

Abloh died on November 28, 2021, of cardiac angiosarcoma at the age of 41. The diagnosis was not made public.

Following the passing of Abloh, Ib Kamara was appointed Art & Image Director for Off-White on April 30, 2022.

Collaborations
Off-White has collaborated with brands and designers such as Nike, Levi, Rimowa, Jimmy Choo, Ikea, Moncler, Browns, Warby Parker, SSENSE, Sunglass Hut, Champion, Evian, Converse, Dr. Martens, Barneys New York, Umbro, Timberland, Takashi Murakami, Heron Preston, ASAP Rocky, Byredo, Boys Noize, Le Bon Marché, Chrome Hearts, Asspizza, A.C. Milan and Kerwin Frost.

In Fall 2016, and Winter 2017, the company collaborated with Levi's main line, Made & Crafted, and released twelve pieces, six of which were unisex.

In early 2017, the company collaborated with Nike and worked on a project named "The Ten", which is a sneaker collection featuring Air Jordans, Converse, Nike Air Max, Nike Air Force One, and Nike Blazers shoes. The collaborations shoe line was divided into two categories, the "Revealing" and "Ghosting". The Off-White and Nike designers had an updated take on Nineties-style shoes, with various patterns and different types of material such as plastic and tulle.

In 2017, the company collaborated with Champion developing sixteen items of clothing, including tracksuits, hoodies, fleeces, and t-shirts. In August 2017, the company also collaborated with ASAP Rocky with his label AWGE. In 2018, the company partnered with Jimmy Choo to create a Summer/Spring collection inspired by Lady Diana, former Princess of Wales.

In April 2018, the company collaborated with IKEA on furniture targeted towards millennials. In Fall 2018 and Winter 2019, the company collaborated with Sunglass Hut on a unisex line of sunglasses called "For Your Eyes Only". In March 2019, the company collaborated with SSENSE on a range of workout clothes.
On June 5, 2018, the company released its collaboration with Rimowa, a transparent suitcase in limited edition. Following the success of the collaboration, a second collection including two RIMOWA x Off-White transparent suitcases (a white version and a black version) is launched in October 2018.

In June 2019, the company collaborated with the Museum of Contemporary Art in Chicago, to create a new "University Blue" color of the Nike Air Force One.

See also
 Nike and Off-White: 'The Ten'

References

External links
 

Clothing companies established in 2012
Retail companies established in 2012
2010s fashion
Clothing retailers of Italy
LVMH brands